Chile has two distinct electoral division systems:
 To elect members of the Chamber of Deputies and of the Senate, Chile is divided into several electoral divisions, namely electoral districts and senatorial constituencies.
 To elect members of the Regional Councils, Chile is divided into several provincial constituencies, each of which correspond to one province, except for a few ones that are divided into several constituencies.

Electoral districts

There are 60 electoral districts (distrito electoral). Each district elects two deputies. Districts are made of groups of communes.

Notes: "VAP" is voting age population (population 18 and above on 13 December 2009); "Valid votes" is equal to "Total votes" minus null votes and blank votes; "T" are total votes; "E" is enrolled population; "V" are valid votes. The voting results are for the 13 December 2009 Chamber of Deputies election.

Senatorial constituencies

There are 19 senatorial constituencies (circunscripción senatorial). Each region constitutes a senatorial constituency, except regions V, RM, VII, VIII and IX, which are each divided into two senatorial constituencies. Each senatorial constituency elects two senators. Senatorial constituencies which are not full regions are made up of several electoral districts within a region.

In 2009 the Constitution was modified so that each region constitutes at least one senatorial constituency. The law determining senatorial constituencies has not been revised to reflect this change, so the list continues to be as follows:

Provincial constituencies

There are 64 provincial constituencies (circunscripción provincial). Each province constitutes a provincial constituency, except Valparaíso, Santiago, Cachapoal, Concepción and Cautín, which are divided into two, six, two, three and two constituencies, respectively. The number of regional advisors each constituency elects depends on its population.

The following five provinces are divided into two to six provincial constituencies, each containing a number of communes:

Valparaíso Province
Valparaíso I: Puchuncaví, Quintero, Concón, and Viña del Mar.
Valparaíso II: Juan Fernández, Valparaíso, and Casablanca.
Santiago Province
Santiago I: Pudahuel, Quilicura, Conchalí, Huechuraba, and Renca.
Santiago II: Independencia, Recoleta, Santiago, Quinta Normal, Cerro Navia, and Lo Prado.
Santiago III: Maipú, Cerrillos, and Estación Central.
Santiago IV: Ñuñoa, Providencia, Las Condes, Vitacura, Lo Barnechea, and La Reina.
Santiago V: Peñalolén, La Granja, Macul, San Joaquín, and La Florida.
Santiago VI: El Bosque, La Cisterna, San Ramón, Lo Espejo, Pedro Aguirre Cerda, San Miguel, and La Pintana.
Cachapoal Province
Cachapoal I: Rancagua.
Cachapoal II: Mostazal, Graneros, Codegua, Machalí, Olivar, Doñihue, Coltauco, Las Cabras, Peumo, Coinco, Malloa, Quinta de Tilcoco, Rengo, Requínoa, Pichidegua, and San Vicente.
Concepción Province
Concepción I: Tomé, Penco, Hualpén, and Talcahuano.
Concepción II: Chiguayante, Concepción, and Florida.
Concepción III: San Pedro de la Paz, Coronel, Lota, Hualqui, and Santa Juana.
Cautín Province
Cautín I: Temuco, and Padre Las Casas.
Cautín II: Galvarino, Lautaro, Perquenco, Vilcún, Melipeuco, Carahue, Cholchol, Freire, Nueva Imperial, Pitrufquén, Saavedra, Teodoro Schmidt, Cunco, Curarrehue, Gorbea, Loncoche, Pucón, Toltén, and Villarrica.

See also
Elections in Chile
Administrative divisions of Chile

References

Subdivisions of Chile
Politics of Chile
Chile
Chile politics-related lists